Wheeler High School is a public high school located in Union Township, west of Valparaiso, Indiana, United States.  The school is attached to Union Township Middle School and was previously located in Wheeler, Indiana.  It is a part of the Union Township School Corporation.

Academics

Vocational education
Wheeler High School features a Law Enforcement Career Academy.  This program is available to all juniors and seniors and is intended for students wishing to pursue careers in Police, Courts, or Corrections. Students at all area schools are allowed to enroll. The students can also receive three college credits from Vincennes University.

Junior and senior students may also take vocational classes at other area schools via the Porter County Vocational Education program.

Fine arts
Wheeler High School has a choir, band (marching band, pep and colorguard) art department, and drama department.

Athletics
Wheeler High School offers multiple athletic teams during the academic year and includes an indoor swimming pool, a fieldhouse, and a standard gym on campus. Athletic teams are known as the Bearcats and the school has won state championships in boys basketball (2010) and softball (2010).

Boys sports
Baseball
Basketball
Bowling
Cross Country
Football
Golf
Soccer
Swimming and Diving
Tennis
Track and Field
Wrestling

Girls sports
Basketball
Bowling
Cheerleading
Cross Country
Soccer
Softball
Tennis
Track and Field
Volleyball
Swimming

Demographics
In the 2009–2010 school year, Wheeler High was 49.4% female and 50.6% male.  The racial breakdown was:
White            89.9%
Black             1.7%
Hispanic          2.9%
Asian             0.5%
Native American   0.5%
Multiracial       4.4%

Notable alumni
Jared Arambula - Paralympic Men's Basketball player
Becca Bruszewski - Women's Basketball player

Accomplishments
2010 IHSAA Boys Basketball Class 2A Champions
2010 IHSAA Girls Softball Class 2A Champions

See also
 List of high schools in Indiana

References

External links

Union Township School Corporation website

Public high schools in Indiana
Schools in Porter County, Indiana